Florida literature is as varied as the state itself. Genres traditionally include fiction, nonfiction, and poetry, and some of it may be considered part of the American regional Southern literature genre. Writers affiliated with the locale of Florida include William Bartram, Elizabeth Bishop, James Branch Cabell, Hart Crane, Stephen Crane, Harry Crews, Nilo Cruz, John Fleming, Ernest Hemingway, Carl Hiaasen, Jay Hopler, Zora Neale Hurston, José Martí, Campbell McGrath, Marjorie Kinnan Rawlings, Wallace Stevens, and Harriet Beecher Stowe.

Florida literature is a combination of written and verbal history that explains on the development of Florida City. It contributes to part of the Southern Literature of South America. Florida Literature points out different forms of genre that have evolved in the state of Florida since 15th century. Similarly, it mentions on different talented artists throughout the century. Legendary artists such as Elmore Leonard, Harry Crews, Pat Frank and Zora Hurston have intensively contributed to the growth and sustainability of Florida literature. The literature not only touches on the literature but also the central ideas that touch on the social, economic and political aspect human being.

Section 1: Overview of the history of Florida Literature 
The history of Florida literature can be traced back in during the Spanish colonizers (Bernard and Kathryn )[1]. They were the first people to take over Florida states of Louisiana, Alabama, Mississippi, Georgia. Under the leadership of Juan Ponce de León, the Spanish colonizers landed in the coastline of Bahamas. Somewhere close to Cape Canaveral was a land mass and he name it La Florida. The initial intension was to explore new regions, seek out treasure and conduct missionary works. During the conquest, European settlers were not allowed to make permanent residence in Florida instead they had to apply force which forced the native Indians to comply [2]. Throughout the settlement, various scientific discoveries were made based on the natural, economic and historic nature of the area. There was more to Florida than an indigenous land with indigenous people. Its beautiful coastlines, lakes and natural forest attracted analysists and surveyors like Bernard Romans. The naturalist carefully studied and analyzed the topography of Florida and even wrote books about it. The topographic information was based on climatic conditions, wildlife, and natural vegetations. The studies aided the Spanish colonizers in conquering more parts of Florida. They understood the best times to sail, different infections that they were susceptible to and quality grounds for residence[3]. This led to the development of the first form of literature. William Bartram joins in and write on Travels. The books touches on the specimens of plants present in Florida and the native Indians. His report contributed to the conquest of Florida. Many books written after the conquest acted as guides to Florida, provided lists of tools and supplies needed to establish permanent stay, and also held histories the collision between the Indian settlers and the Spanish colony[4]. A record of all these information promoted the development of literature, which was later name Florida literature.

Early developmental stages of Florida literature.

Deep in the 20th century, Florida became prominent for historical myths based on the undertakings of the early explorers . Renowned authors such as Caroline Lee, Thomas Mayne, Washington Irving, and James Fenimore Cooper emerged, writing on some of the blood-shedding adventures that contributed to the development of the great Florida City[5]. Conclusively, the literature starts out with myths before in was penned in books. These first authors helped define the path to literature in terms of setting, characters, plot, and point of view.

Using their own experiences to explain on diverse themes, Floridian authors became internationally recognized in the world of literature[6]. An inspiration that saw other authors join in after four decades to write captivating novels such as The Lost Virgin of the South, A tale of the Seminole War, and The Adventures of Robin Day which touch on love and romance, ideologies, American chronicle, and wars[7]. The inspiration that drove Florida literature was derived from different sources, especially the surrounding environment. Interaction with the native Indians brought about romantic novels while Spanish ideologies created historical books such as La Florida. This continued through the 19th century to today, however, some adjustments have been made to ensure inclusivity of overtime changes . Changes such as the absence of extreme cases of wars, pirating, racial discrimination among others[8]. Today, Florida authors are not limited to books writings but have also incorporated short stories and dramas that entertain and enlighten the young about Florida's culture and histories.

In accord with Benard Romans, Bancroft Colette's article which was published by Campa Bay Times concludes that a large part of the literature's content was built by authors that were not Floridians[9]. Romans who drew the maps and conducted surveys was from the Netherlands and just migrated to America in 1756. William Bartram on the other hand was commissioned by the Spanish colonies to explore the organization of indigenous people and assess whether the territory can be conquered. Beside the two, current authors such as Ernest Hemingway, Pat Frank, and Peter Matthiessen live in outside countries and towns but once they explore on the city of Florida, they get an inspiration to write about it[10]. The discussion deduces the conclusion that Florida Literature was and is built upon artistic talent, efforts, knowledge and not where he or she came from.

Section 2: Literary genre and styles 
A variety of literary genres were used as a way of appreciating indigenous cultures, entertaining, and expressing opinions and ideas. Different centauries have experienced the emergence of different genres. It first started out with myths and novels poetry and now there are fiction and non-fictions stories, dramas, films among other literature. These artistic talents are not for adults but have been structure in a way that includes kids too. The best example is the innovation of Disney where kids can get entertained and learn about the different historical background of the city.[11]. The ideas from novels and books of Florida's best authors are largely used in activities such as film creation, school curriculum and research. A clear indication of just how vital literature is. It not just as source of information but an archive of information regarding the birth and development of Florida city.

Evolution of Florida's Literary styles and genre 
To expound more on Florida City, authors developed genres such as short stories, humor, essays, fiction, dramas, and poems. Poems acted as the main literature genre before authors came up with other forms of genres. As stated by Whitman Albery, the 15th and 16th century experienced more poetry expressions than succeeding centuries[12]. It was majorly used by the blacks who were shipped as slaves by European colonizers. During the 16th century, many colonies were in the process of establishing colonies. Through such endeavors, the idea of African enslavement was practiced. African men and women would be shipped to the European countries as sources of labor. Through the interaction between African and European peoples, African -American people were born. However, this did not mean total acceptance. They were secluded and invisible boundaries regarding interactions, place of residence and education were drawn. This led to the development of first poems. African-Americans used poetry to articulate their suffering as a result of the seclusion . The poetries mentioned some of the social injustices that African-American people experienced in the hands of the whites (Whitman ). Since the black did not have the freedom to express themselves publicly, the poems remained unprinted. On the other hand, European articulated their ideas through novels, short stories dramas, and fiction.[13]. They had the right channels and avenues to print and showcase artistic talents. They used the opportunity to create and print the first genre, a novel.

Carl Hiaasen, a top novelist holds that genre such as novels were highly propelled by the topography of the city, growing population, cultures and tradition, and high promotion of journalism. Increased population meant an increase in crime[14]. Such opportunities innovated crime fiction in books and films. The purpose was to address the issue and entertain the audience with new ideas. Topography on the other hand encouraged authors to write short environmental stories that could also be used in school for educational purposes. Lastly, poetry was born to describe the existence of diversity in race, culture, and traditions. It also ridiculed and criticized acts of exclusivity such as racial segregation[15]. Authors uniquely used literary elements such as plot, characters, themes, point of view, and style to create new literatures thus contributing to evolution of variety of literatures.

Section 3: Themes in Florida literature 
There is always an ultimate goal to be realized when an author decided to write a poem, drama, or fiction. Most of the writings are aimed at addressing issues faced in society. Squeeze Me, by Carl Hiaasen, addresses the shattered political and legal systems and human-nature conflict that exists in the state of Florida (Hiaasen). The novel displays on what is currently happening in the state, the innocents being punished and the guilty rewarded. The justice system of Florida receives criticism and ridicule for being biased in regards to racial differences (B. Nelson)[16]. Most times, it is the black people who are caught on the wrong side of the law and harsh judgment is taken on them. An indication of how the legal system lacks transparency in dealing with black people's cases. Through the novels and dramas, authors illustrate and further provide solution on the change that can be implemented. The Literary works of Florida do not just entertain but open people's eyes to the cracks present in the city.

Diversity in ideas addressed by Florida literature 
Jake and Wolff, editors of The Florida Review provide a platform for authors to express ideas through website magazines[17]. Through this channel, different authors with literature talents can post poems, novels parts, fiction, and short films. They also identify young upcoming artists who encourage their work by posting it through different social media platforms since they help build on the future of Florida literature. They upload the author's work after thorough checks to ensure quality[18]. Charges range depending on the type and amount of work that the authors do. These platforms are indicators of the continuous growth of Florida literature.

Section 4: Benefits of Florida literature 
The benefits of Florida Literature cannot be underestimated. From the pre-colonial period to date, literature has been a vital part of human life[19]. It describes the different stages in words that are both attractive and captivating. Through different literary genres, authors are able to preserve indigenous cultures such as Cubans, Latinos, and Havana[20]. Literature has adequately built a moral society that values and appreciates honesty, integrity, and respect for human life. By pointing out themes of corruption, racial segregation, conflict, and violence, authors illustrate the consequence of indulging in such acts. Florida literature has grown majorly because it is tightly attached to human life, authors express emotions, and discontentment and touch on the very issues that affect daily life[21]. Lastly, Florida literature acts as an archive for storing information and knowledge about the city of Florida. It highlights some of the best natural resources surrounding the beautiful city thus making it a center for tourist attraction[22]. It is important to acknowledge the effort placed by both early and modern authors in building what is now known as Florida literature[23]. Their efforts have created an understanding of modern-day Florida through the genre

[1] (Bernard and Kathryn ) Explain the first colonizer of Florida

[2] (Bernard and Kathryn ) Purpose of the conquest

[3] (Whitman ) Touches on the land's topography

[4] (Bernard and Kathryn ) Natives of Florida, 1999

[5] (Bernard and Kathryn ) First founder of Florida literature

[6] (Bernard and Kathryn ) Prominence of literature

[7] (Bernard and Kathryn ) First novels to be penned

[8] (Whitman ) Dominant topics

[9] (Brancroft) Diversity of authors

[10] (Brancroft) Literary works from outside authors

[11] (Hiaasen) Example of fiction

[12] (Whitman ) Start of poetry

[13] (Bernard and Kathryn ) Verbal and printed poetry

[14] (Hiaasen) Contributive factors of literary works

[15] (Hiaasen) Critiques and ridicules addressed by early poetry

[16] (B. Nelson) Justice system of Florida literature

[17] (Wolff, Hart and Campbell) Social media platforms for expressing literary talents

[18] (Wolff, Hart and Campbell) Quality checks of different genre

[19] (Bernard and Kathryn ) Need for the preservation of Florida Literature

[20] (B. Nelson) Cultures present in Florida City

[21] (Hiaasen) Social aspects touched by Florida Literature

[22] (Brancroft) Topography and climatic conditions

[23] (Wolff, Hart and Campbell) Contemporary Florida literature

History

A printing press began operating in St. Augustine in 1783.

Organizations
The Florida Publishers Group formed in 1983. The Florida Center for the Book was established in 1984. The South Florida Writers Association formed in 1990, and the Florida Writers Association in 2001.

Awards and events
The Key West Literary Seminar began in 1983, and the Miami Book Fair in 1984. The Florida Book Awards for "best Florida literature" began in 2006, administered by Florida State University Libraries; recent nonfiction awardees include Susan Cerulean, Jace E. Davis, Gilbert King, Henry Knight, William McKeen, and Margaret Ross Tolbert.

See also
 Florida literature (in French)
 :Category:Florida in fiction
 :Category:Writers from Florida
 Cuban American literature (related in part to literature of Florida)
 List of newspapers in Florida
 :Category:Florida folklore
 :Category:Libraries in Florida
 Floridiana
 Southern literature (United States)
 American literary regionalism

References

Bibliography
  
 
 
 
 
 
 
 
  1988-

Examples of Floridiana
  (Anthology)
  (Bibliography)

External links
 
 
  (Syllabus)
 
  (Directory ceased in 2017)

American literature by state
literature